Acrocercops zebrulella is a moth of the family Gracillariidae. It is known from Puerto Rico.

References

zebrulella
Moths of the Caribbean
Moths described in 1931